Devendra Jain (born 30 July 1962) is an Indian former cricketer. He played one first-class match for Delhi in 1984/85.

See also
 List of Delhi cricketers

References

External links
 

1962 births
Living people
Indian cricketers
Delhi cricketers
Cricketers from Delhi